Teladan Stadium is a multi-purpose stadium in Medan, Indonesia.  It is currently used mostly for football matches. It is the home stadium of PSMS Medan. The stadium holds 20,000 people.

References

Buildings and structures in Medan
PSMS Medan
Sports venues in Indonesia
Football venues in Indonesia
Multi-purpose stadiums in Indonesia
Sport in North Sumatra